Eugenia salamensis is a species of plant in the family Myrtaceae. It is found in Costa Rica, El Salvador, Honduras, and Mexico.

References

salamensis
Flora of Costa Rica
Flora of El Salvador
Flora of Honduras
Flora of Mexico
Endangered biota of Mexico
Endangered flora of North America
Taxonomy articles created by Polbot